Chlorida transversalis is a species of beetle in the family Cerambycidae. It was described by Jean Baptiste Lucien Buquet in 1844. It is known from Colombia.

References

Bothriospilini
Beetles described in 1844
Beetles of South America